Gwynedd Council, which styles itself by its Welsh name Cyngor Gwynedd, is the governing body for the county of Gwynedd, one of the principal areas of Wales. The council administrates internally using the Welsh language.

History
The county of Gwynedd was created in 1974 under the Local Government Act 1972, covering the area of the abolished administrative counties of Anglesey, Caernarfonshire, most of Merioneth, and a small part of Denbighshire. The new county created in 1974 was named "Gwynedd" after the medieval Kingdom of Gwynedd which had covered the area until its division into counties under the Statute of Rhuddlan in 1284, following the Conquest of Wales by Edward I.

From 1974 until 1996 Gwynedd County Council served the area as an upper-tier county council, with the county also being divided into five lower-tier districts: Aberconwy, Arfon, Dwyfor, Meirionnydd, and Ynys Môn-Isle of Anglesey.

Local government across Wales was reorganised again in 1996 under the Local Government (Wales) Act 1994, which replaced the previous two tier system of counties and districts with "principal areas" (each designated either a "county" or a "county borough"), whose councils perform the functions previously divided between the county and district councils. The pre-1996 county of Gwynedd was divided between three principal areas:
Anglesey (a county) covering the district of Ynys Môn-Isle of Anglesey.
Conwy County Borough covering the Aberconwy district and the neighbouring Colwyn district from Clwyd.
"Caernarfonshire and Merionethshire" (a county) covering the Arfon, Dwyfor, and Meirionnydd districts.
During the transition to the new system, the shadow authority elected for the latter requested a change of name from "Caernarfonshire and Merionethshire" to "Gwynedd". The government confirmed the change with effect from 2 April 1996, one day after the new council came into being.

Since 1996, Gwynedd has therefore been a single-tier principal area, covering a smaller area than the pre-1996 county of the same name. Although the principal area is designated as a county, the council styles itself as "Gwynedd Council" rather than "Gwynedd County Council", the latter having been the style used by the pre-1996 upper-tier authority.

Second home controversy 
Controversy erupted in mid-winter 2001 when Seimon Glyn, Gwynedd Council's housing committee chairman and Plaid Cymru member,  voiced frustration over "English immigrants" moving into traditionally Welsh speaking communities.  Glyn was commenting on a report underscoring the dilemma of rocketing house prices outstripping what locals could pay, with the report warning that "...traditional Welsh communities could die out..." as a consequence.

In 2001 nearly a third of all purchases of properties in Gwynedd were by buyers from out of the county, with some communities reporting as many as a third of local homes used as holiday homes.  Holiday home owners typically spend less than six months of the year in the local community.

The issue of locals being priced out of the local housing market is common to many rural communities throughout Britain, but in Wales the added dimension of language further complicates the issue, as many new residents do not learn the Welsh language.

Concerned for the Welsh language under these pressures, Glyn said "Once you have more than 50% of anybody living in a community that speaks a foreign language, then you lose your indigenous tongue almost immediately". His comments attracted strong criticism of Plaid Cymru from other national parties.

By spring 2002 both the Snowdonia National Park (Welsh: Parc Cenedlaethol Eryri) and Pembrokeshire Coast National Park (Welsh: Parc Cenedlaethol Arfordir Penfro) authorities began limiting second home ownership within the parks, following the example set by Exmoor. According to planners in Snowdonia and Pembroke applicants for new homes must demonstrate a proven local need or the applicant must have strong links with the area.

Anti-Semitism accusations 
In 2014, the council passed a motion which called for a trade embargo with Israel and was subsequently accused of Anti-Semitism by the organisation Jewish Human Rights Watch. Jewish Human Rights Watch won the right to a judicial review of Cyngor Gwynedd's decision, but their claim was dismissed by the High Court in June 2016.

Llais Gwynedd
In 2008, Llais Gwynedd or Voice of Gwynedd, a regionalist pressure group won several seats on Gwynedd Council. It demanded an end to cutbacks in rural areas threatening schools, a relaxation of planning controls, action to provide rural employment and calls for more to be done to protect Gwynedd's "unique cultural, linguistic and social fabric". The group was represented on the council between 2008 and the 2022 election, when it lost all its seats.

Political control
 
The first election to the county council was held in 1973, initially operating as a shadow authority alongside the outgoing authorities before coming into its powers on 1 April 1974. A shadow authority was again elected in 1995 ahead of the reforms which came into force on 1 April 1996. Political control of the council since 1974 has been as follows:

Upper-tier county

Principal area

Leadership
The leaders of the council since 1996 have been:

Current composition 
As of 5 May 2022:

Party with majority control in bold

Elections
Since 2012, council elections have taken place every five years.

Party with the most elected councillors in bold. Coalition agreements in notes column.

A by-election for Diffwys and Maenofferen was held in July 2010 and Llais Gwynedd narrowly held the seat.

Further by-elections in the Bowydd a Rhiw, held in September 2010, and Seiont, held in October 2010, led to a Plaid Cymru gain from Llais Gwynedd and a Llais Gwynedd gain from Independent respectively.

A by-election for the vacant Arllechwedd ward was held in June 2011, resulting in a Plaid Cymru gain from the Liberal Democrats. The Glyder ward was also vacant at the same time, after the death of the Plaid Cymru councillor. Plaid Cymru held the seat in the by-election held in July 2011, allowing the party to gain full control of the council with 38 seats, one seat being vacant at the time.

By-elections held for the Diffwys a Maenofferen and Penrhyndeudraeth wards in September 2011 resulted in a gain for Plaid Cymru over Llais Gwynedd and a Plaid Cymru hold respectively. This ensured Plaid Cymru's control of the council, with no seat vacancies.

Premises
The council has its main offices at the Council Offices in Caernarfon. The complex lies either side of Shirehall Street within the town walls. On the western side of the street is the former Caernarvon Gaol, built in 1869 as the county prison for Caernarfonshire. After it closed as a prison in 1921 the building was converted to become offices for the old Caernarfonshire County Council, transferring to the new Gwynedd County Council in 1974. At the northern end of the former prison buildings is an extension built in 1984 comprising a council chamber and archway linking it back to the former prison building, with the council's coat of arms prominently displayed above the archway. The council chamber itself is now called Siambr Dafydd Orwig after Dafydd Orwig, an advocate of the Welsh language and bilingual education in Wales who was a long-standing member of the county council. He died in 1996 whilst serving as chairman of the council. Prior to the construction of the new council chamber in 1984, the council had met at County Hall.

On the opposite eastern side of Shirehall Street, extending through to Castle Street, is a modern office building built in the 1980s which houses many of the council's departments. The council also maintains area offices at the former Dwyfor District Council offices in Pwllheli and at Cae Penarlâg in Dolgellau, which had been built in 1953 for the old Merioneth County Council and subsequently served as the headquarters of Meirionnydd District Council until the 1996 reorganisation.

Electoral divisions, areas and committees 
The council operates a decentralised system of administration, with three area committees:
Arfon
Dwyfor
Meirionnydd

Electoral divisions 

Since 2022 the county borough has been divided into 65 wards, returning 69 councillors.
Between 2004 and 2022 the county borough was divided into 71 electoral wards returning 75 councillors. There are a number of elected community councils in the region. The following table lists the pre-2022 council wards, communities and associated geographical areas. Communities with a community council are indicated with a '* ':

Arfon

Dwyfor

Meirionnydd

References

External links 
Gwynedd Council

Government of Gwynedd
Local authorities of Wales